Stadion am Halberg is a multi-use stadium in Taunusstein, Germany.  It is the former home venue of the footballclub of SV Wehen, before the team moved to the newly built BRITA-Arena in Wiesbaden.  The stadium has a capacity of 5,000 people.

Football venues in Germany
Rheingau-Taunus-Kreis
Sports venues in Hesse